The Levitin effect is a phenomenon whereby people, even those without musical training, tend to remember songs in the correct key. The finding stands in contrast to the large body of laboratory literature suggesting that such details of perceptual experience are lost during the process of memory encoding, so that people would remember melodies with relative pitch rather than absolute pitch.

The effect was first documented by Daniel J. Levitin in 1994 and was regarded as a significant result in cognitive psychology. In 2012, the effect was replicated for the first time. There are theories as to the possible development of this effect and a strong differentiation between a person's ability to distinguish relative pitch versus absolute pitch. Cognitive disorders can affect a person's ability to experience the Levitin effect.

Levitin effect studies 
Levitin's original study consisted of 46 volunteer students from Stanford University asked to participate in the study. Upon arrival, the students filled out a background questionnaire and selected two songs from 56 previously chosen CDs. Volunteers then attempted to sing a part of their songs. The study's results showed that 40% of the participants could sing a correct pitch in at least one of their songs. 12% hit the right pitch on both trials, and 44% hit the pitch within two semitones. 

The second study was conducted in 2012 and completed in 6 European Labs. This study was a competitive replication of Levitin's original study. This study showed that 25% of participants could sing the correct pitch in at least one of their songs. 4% sang the correct pitches in both songs. These studies show that people can generally remember songs similar to how they heard, even with no reference music. When compared to Levitin's original study, the replication showed a lower data trend, meaning that a smaller percentage of the population could recall the relative pitch.  

More data is needed to understand how much of the population can accurately recall the relative pitch of a selected song.

Possible developments 
Levitin offers possible explanations for this phenomenon, by describing how even young children have this ability to a certain degree, so this ability to recognize musical patterns could be located in the cerebellum the brain. The cerebellum helps to control balance and coordination, but when listening to music the cerebellum helps the body interpret rhythm. Researchers at Lawrence Parsons and Peter Fox of University of Texas Health Science Center ran brain scans on conductors and saw an increase of blood flow to the cerebellum when they were following along to sheet music and listening to it at the same time. The scans showed that as the rhythm changed, the amount of blood flow in the cerebellum changed as well. There are few theories that try and explain this occurrence. One theory states our ancestors needed to synchronize their steps in nature to avoid making more noise than necessary while hunting. Another theory suggests that those early humans who were able to distinguish rudimentary rhythms may have been able to hear and interpret different footsteps making them more attuned to the environment around them and have better survival instincts. Those who distinguish different sounds in the environment were more likely to survive and pass along their genetics. These are just possible theories as to how humans have developed pitch and rhythmic interpretation. There is no distinct evidence proving or disproving these theories.

Absolute vs. relative pitch 
Absolute pitch, also referred to as perfect pitch, is the ability to correctly identify or recreate a sound or pitch without needing a reference. This ability is rare among humans, but there has been shown to be a correlation between those who were exposed to music while they were babies and those who possess this ability. There is also evidence that this can be genetic, meaning that those who have a family member with absolute pitch are more likely to have it as well. Musicians generally consider perfect pitch helpful, but many successful musicians possess only relative pitch, which is the ability to identify changes in pitch and timbre in music. Relative pitch is far more common in the population, and unlike perfect pitch, it is not believed to be based on any musical training or exposure. In fact, this was what Levitin was attempting to show in his experiments. While most humans have an innate ability to distinguish musical intervals, musicians of many backgrounds find extensive ear training, to formalize their understanding, essential. While most of the human population has some general understanding of pitch, there exist people who are truly "tone-deaf." This inability to process and understand changes in pitch, known as amusia, can be congenital or acquired.

Cognitive disorders 
There are certain disorders in the brain that can prevent someone from having the ability to perceive relative pitch. These disorders can be congenital or developed. Amusia is a term used to describe someone who has difficulty differentiating pitch or identifying music. Congenital amusia is often referred to as being tone-deaf. Those with congenital amusia can process speech, differences in people's voices and hear environmental sounds, but most cannot identify patterns in music. They describe it as not being able to "hear" music, which sounds like somebody banging different pots and pans, rather than a rhythmic melody. The level of amusia can differ too. Some people can distinguish different songs and "hear" the music, while others have absolutely no understanding of music. Amusia can also be developed through traumatic brain injuries or lesions and tumours on the brain. Those who once could perceive relative pitch can lose this ability through an event like a head injury in a car crash. Sometimes this condition is reversible, but there is not a way to know if the person will be able to distinguish pitches again. This reason for this condition is not exactly known, but research and brain scans indicate that part of the cause may be located in the frontal cortex of the brain.

References

Music cognition
Music psychology